The 2022 Tennessee Volunteers football team represented the University of Tennessee in the 2022 NCAA Division I FBS football season. The Volunteers played their home games at Neyland Stadium in Knoxville, Tennessee, and competed in the Eastern Division of the Southeastern Conference (SEC). They were led by second-year head coach Josh Heupel.

On October 15, 2022, Tennessee beat the No. 3-ranked Alabama Crimson Tide, winning the rivalry game for the first time since 2006. Fans rushed the field at Neyland Stadium and tore down the goalposts, carrying them around campus and eventually throwing them into the Tennessee River. The university was fined $100,000 by the Southeastern Conference as a result of rushing the field. The university received $152,000 in donations from the fans to replace the goalposts. The Volunteers capped off an impressive 11 win season against the Clemson Tigers, winning the 2022 Orange Bowl 31-14, the Vols’ first 11 win season since 2001.

Schedule
Tennessee and the SEC announced the 2022 football schedule on September 21, 2021.

Game summaries

vs Ball State

at No. 17 Pittsburgh

vs Akron

vs No. 20 Florida

at No. 25 LSU Tigers

vs No. 3 Alabama

Sources:

vs No. 18 (FCS) UT Martin

vs No. 19 Kentucky

Sources:

at No. 3 Georgia

vs Missouri

at South Carolina

at Vanderbilt

No. 7 Clemson

Roster

Coaching staff

Rankings

References

Tennessee
Tennessee Volunteers football seasons
Orange Bowl champion seasons
Tennessee Volunteers football